A Collection may refer to:

 A Collection (Anne Briggs album), 1999
 A Collection (The Doors album), 2011
 A Collection (Josh Groban album), 2008
 A Collection (Third Eye Blind album), 2006
 A Collection (Underworld album), 2011
 A Collection (The Birthday Party album), a 1987 album by The Birthday Party
 A Collection: Greatest Hits... and More, a 1989 album by Barbra Streisand
 A Collection 1984–1989, a 1995 album by Jane Siberry
 A Collection (DVD), a 2005 DVD by New Order

See also 
 
 Collection (disambiguation)
 The Collection (disambiguation)